The Canal de Saint-Quentin is a canal in northern France connecting the canalised river Escaut in Cambrai to the Canal latéral à l'Oise and Canal de l'Oise à l'Aisne in Chauny.

History
The canal was built in two phases, the second much longer than the first. The king's ministers Colbert and Mazarin had both proposed linking the rivers Oise and Somme in the 17th century and this resulted in the Canal Crozat, or Canal de Picardie, between Chauny and Saint-Simon in 1738. The remainder, connecting the Seine Basin with the Escaut was a lengthy process. The original designer, Devicq in 1727, died in 1742. Little was accomplished until Napoléon demanded that work begin again in 1801. He officiated at the opening in April 1810.

The canal was such a success that the locks had to be duplicated throughout in the early 20th century, at the same time deepening the channel, enlarging the tunnels, and increasing water supplies. Later improvements included electric barge traction on rails, installed during World War I, mechanising locks, and providing public lighting on the busiest sections. Later, the locks were equipped for automatic operation, using remote sensors, and more recently by handheld remote control. By 1878, up to 110 barges were crossing the summit level daily. The Canal du Nord was built as a duplicate route and completed in 1965. The canal carried more freight than any other man-made waterway in France in 1964.

Battle of St Quentin Canal

The Canal in World War I formed part of the Hindenburg Line, a German defensive position built during the winter of 1916–1917. The Allied crossing of the St Quentin Canal in 1918 was a significant part of the Hundred Days Offensive that led to the Armistice.

Navigation 
This canal is an asset for tourism, boating and on the towpath, especially the northern section in the Escaut valley, the spectacular summit level with its tunnels and the boat harbour in the basin at Saint-Quentin. Commercial traffic declined after opening of the Canal du Nord, and it is now consistently quiet and peaceful, although a few Freycinet barges still use this route.

En route
PK 0 Cambrai
PK 11 Masnières
PK 18 Les Rues-des-Vignes
PK 23 Honnecourt-sur-Escaut
PK 28.5-35 Riqueval Tunnel (5670m) Bony
PK 42-43 Tronquoy Tunnel (1098m) Lesdins
PK 53 Saint-Quentin
PK 62 Séraucourt-le-Grand
PK 68 Right Petite Somme: Saint-Simon to Ham, closed 2006 (link to Canal de la Somme), route continues left
PK 80.5 Voyaux
PK 83 Tergnier
PK 85 T-junction left 3.8 km branch to Canal de la Sambre à l'Oise Right continues as Canal de Saint-Quentin
PK 92 Chauny, the canal continues as Canal latéral à l'Oise towards Paris. Left Canal de l'Oise à l'Aisne

References

External links 
 Video showing the "Souterrain de Riqueval" and local area
 Canal de Saint-Quentin with maps and details of places, moorings and services (by the author of Inland Waterways of France, Imray)
 Navigation details for 80 French rivers and canals (French waterways website section)

Saint-Quentin
Canals opened in 1810
Cambrai